Irangani Manel Abeysekera is a Sri Lankan diplomat. Having served as Sri Lankan Ambassador in Germany and Thailand, she is known as Sri Lanka's first woman career diplomat.

Education
She was born to E. W. Kannangara, a prominent civil servant who had served as the Clerk of the State Council. Educated at Methodist College, Colombo, she read history at Somerville College, Oxford. After joining the Overseas Service she studied modern languages at New Hall, Cambridge.

Abeysekera is an Honorary Fellow of Somerville College.

Diplomatic career

After graduating from Oxford in 1957, she returned to Ceylon and applied to the newly formed Ceylon Overseas Service through the Ceylon Civil Service, having become only female in the batch of eight selected candidates. Having been appointed to the service as the first female recruit, she became the first female diplomat in Sri Lanka.

Having completed her modern languages training at Cambridge, she was made permanent in her appointment and took up the post of Third Secretary at the Ceylon's High Commission in London. Thereafter she was posted to Thailand as Charge d’ Affaires from 1970 to 1974. Returning to Sri Lanka in 1974 she took up the post of Chief of Protocol at the Ministry of External Affairs and Defence, where she played a major role in organizing the Non-Aligned Summit in 1976. During her tuner she wrote the Foreign Ministry Manual of Protocol Procedure. She then went on to serve as Sri Lankan Ambassador to Thailand, there after Director General - Press and Publicity Division of the Foreign Ministry and finally became Sri Lankan Ambassador to Germany, having accreditation to Austria and Switzerland. She retired from the Foreign Service in 1993.

At present, she works as a Consultant (Foreign Service Training), Ministry of Foreign Affairs and is based at the Lakshman Kadirgamar Institute of International Relations and Strategic Studies and is also as a Consultant on Gender and Development

Family
She married Hector Abeysekera a UN diplomat.

References and external links

1933 births
Living people
Alumni of Methodist College, Colombo
Alumni of Somerville College, Oxford
Alumni of New Hall, Cambridge
Ambassadors of Sri Lanka to Germany
Ambassadors of Sri Lanka to Thailand
Sinhalese civil servants
Sri Lankan diplomats
Sri Lankan women ambassadors
Fellows of Somerville College, Oxford
Date of birth missing (living people)